Hera Pheri is a 1976 Hindi masala film directed by Prakash Mehra and starring Amitabh Bachchan, Saira Banu, Vinod Khanna, Sulakshana Pandit, Shreeram Lagoo and Asrani. The film's music is by Kalyanji Anandji and the lyrics were by Anjaan, Indeevar. 

Vinod Khanna received a Filmfare nomination for Best Supporting Actor. This is one of six films that Vinod Khanna and Amitabh Bachchan starred together in. At the time, the pairing of the two actors often made the film quite successful, especially since both actors were rising stars gunning for the top spot in Hindi Cinema. The movie was an inspiration for the 1978 Telugu movie Rama Krishnulu.

Plot

Vijay and Ajay are two small-time crooks, who loot other rich 'respected' but criminal-minded people for a living. One night, while gambling, Vijay recognizes Sheru, a person who has assisted PK in murdering his father. Vijay's tragic past is something that Ajay is unaware of. PK, meanwhile, roams around scot-free in the disguise of Ghanshyam Das, pretending to be a friend of Vijay. Later on, Ajay discovers his own past and that PK is his father. He deserts Vijay and joins PK. But Ajay has only temporarily started disliking Vijay. Vijay learns the truth about PK. Friendship of Ajay and Vijay is reestablished once Ajay knows the facts. Finally guilty are punished and others live happily ever after.

Cast

Amitabh Bachchan as Vijay
Saira Banu	as Kiran Singh
Vinod Khanna as Ajay
Sulakshana Pandit as Asha
Shreeram Lagoo as Police Commissioner Khanna
Pinchoo Kapoor as P.K. / Ghanshyamdas
P. Jairaj as Dinanath
Asrani as the real son of PK
Yunus Parvez as Dhaniram
Mohan Sherry as Sherry
Urmila Bhatt as Sudha
Dev Kumar as Mr. Khatlewala
Mac Mohan as Mac 
Randhir (actor) as Baba 		
Goga Kapoor as Goga (as Goga)
Ram Sethi as Drunk in Casino
Vikas Anand as Casino Manager
Padma Khanna as Jean, casino girl
Tun Tun as Mrs. Dhaniram
Moolchand

Soundtrack

Awards

References

External links 
 

1976 films
1970s Hindi-language films
Films directed by Prakash Mehra
Films scored by Kalyanji Anandji